Girona Futbol Club "B" is a Spanish football team based in Girona, in the autonomous community of Catalonia. The reserve team of Girona FC was founded in 2011, and plays in Tercera División RFEF – Group 5, holding home matches at Camp Municipal Torres de Palau.

History
Founded in the 2011 summer as Girona B, the club had his registration denied by FCF in his first season, and was inscribed in Segona Catalana in 2012–13.

In his first senior season, Girona B achieved promotion to Primera Catalana, after defeating CE El Cattlar. In 2016, after an agreement between Girona and CF Peralada was established, Girona B was demoted as the club's "C-team".

This new status was formalised on 23 July 2017, when the club was renamed Girona C as a result of CF Peralada's members approving a name change to CF Peralada-Girona B.

At the end of the 2018–19 season, Girona C finished second in their group of the Primera Catalana, missing out on promotion to the Tercera División only on a play-off game. At the same time, CF Peralada's affiliation with Girona ended as they were themselves relegated to the Tercera División, resulting in Girona C being restored to their original name of Girona B.

Girona B later achieved promotion to the fourth division in 2020, after finishing first in their group of the Primera Catalana.

Season to season

1 season in Tercera División
2 seasons in Tercera Federación

Current squad
.

From Youth Academy

Out on loan

Honours
Segona Catalana
Winners (1): 2017–18

Notable players
Sebas Coris
Gerard Gumbau
David Juncà
Carles Mas
Gerard Muñoz
Pere Pons

See also
Girona FC
CF Riudellots

References

External links
Official website 
Futbolme team profile 
 

Football clubs in Catalonia
Association football clubs established in 2011
2011 establishments in Spain

Spanish reserve football teams